Habenaria vatia, commonly known as the curved rein orchid, is a species of orchid, that is endemic Queensland where it is only known from a small number of islands. It has between three and five leaves at its base and up to twenty-five small white flowers with a relatively long green and white nectary spur.

Description 
Flowering occurs from December to January.

Taxonomy and naming
Habenaria vatia was first formally described in 2002 by David Jones, but the name was not validly published. In 2015, Michael Mathieson validated the name and description. The specific epithet (vatia) is a Latin word meaning "bent outward" or "bowlegged".

Distribution and habitat
The curved rein orchid grows with grasses and low shrubs in woodland on Moa Island and other Torres Strait Islands.

Conservation
Habenaria vatia is listed as "vulnerable" under the Queensland Nature Conservation Act 1992.

References

Orchids of Queensland
Endemic orchids of Australia
Plants described in 2002
vatia